Osmate was a comune (municipality) in the Province of Varese in the Italian region Lombardy, located about  northwest of Milan and about  southwest of Varese.

In 2019 it merged with the nearby Cadrezzate forming the new municipality of Cadrezzate con Osmate.

Demographic evolution

References

Cities and towns in Lombardy